

Mary Louise "Missy" Cummings (born 1966) is an American academic who is a professor at Duke University and director of Duke's Humans and Autonomy Laboratory. She was one of the United States Navy's first female fighter pilots. In November 2021, Dr. Cummings joined the National Highway Traffic Safety Administration (NHTSA).

Education  
Cummings received her Bachelor of Science in mathematics from the United States Naval Academy in 1988, a Master of Science in space systems engineering from the Naval Postgraduate School in 1994, and a PhD in systems engineering from the University of Virginia in 2004. Her doctoral thesis was Designing Decision Support Systems for Revolutionary Command and Control Domains.

Career 
Cummings spent eleven years (1988–1999) as a naval officer and military pilot, earning the rank of lieutenant, and was one of the United States Navy's first female fighter pilots, flying an F/A-18 Hornet. She became a fighter pilot shortly after the Combat Exclusion Policy was repealed in 1993, and her book Hornet's Nest recounts her experience with discrimination and hostility as one of the first women in the fighter pilot community. Her first call sign was Medusa and her second was Shrew.

For her last tour in the Navy, Cummings was an NROTC instructor at Pennsylvania State University. After the Navy, she became an assistant professor at Virginia Tech in the school's Engineering Fundamentals Division. After obtaining her PhD at the University of Virginia, she achieved the rank of associate professor of aeronautics and astronautics at the Massachusetts Institute of Technology. She became a full professor at Duke University in 2016. Cummings served on the Board of Directors for the automotive technology company Veoneer, Inc. from 2018 to 2021. She resigned and sold all of her shares in October 2021 prior to starting at the NHTSA.

, Cummings is a professor in the Duke University Department of Electrical and Computer Engineering and the Department of Computer Science. She is an affiliate professor with the University of Washington’s Aeronautics and Astronautics Department and an American Institute of Aeronautics and Astronautics Fellow.

NHTSA appointment and responses 
In October 2021, the Biden administration named Cummings as a new senior advisor for safety at the NHTSA on a "temporary assignment" through the Intergovernmental Personnel Act. Her appointment to the NHTSA was met with criticism from Tesla's CEO Elon Musk and personal harassment and death threats from Tesla advocates in response to her previous statements critical of Tesla. U.S. Secretary of Transportation Pete Buttigieg defended Cummings' appointment, and the NHTSA said that it was "look[ing] forward to leveraging her experience and leadership in safety and autonomous technologies." National Transportation Safety Board chair Jennifer Homendy surmised the Tesla advocates' responses to be a "calculated attempt to distract from the real safety issues". In January 2022, Cummings was required by NHTSA to recuse herself from any matters related to Tesla.

Focus and views 
Cummings's research interests include human supervisory control, artificial intelligence, human-autonomous system collaboration and human-robot interaction, human-systems engineering, and the socio-ethical impact of technology. Cummings has written on the brittleness of machine learning and future applications for drones. In addition, she has spoken critically of the safety of Tesla's Full Self-Driving Capability surrounding its reliance on computer vision.

References

External links
 Hargrave Pioneers profile
 Missy Cumming's profile on EngineerGirl.org

MIT Profile
 Factually episode on autonomous driving featuring Cummings

1960s births
Year of birth uncertain
Living people
United States Naval Academy alumni
Female United States Navy officers
United States Naval Aviators
American women aviators
Naval Postgraduate School alumni
University of Virginia School of Engineering and Applied Science alumni
Women systems engineers
American women engineers
Virginia Tech faculty
MIT School of Engineering faculty
Duke University faculty
American women academics
21st-century American women